The Greiner–Murray ministry (1991–92) or Second Greiner–Murray ministry or Second Greiner ministry was the 81st ministry of the New South Wales Government, and was led by the 37th Premier of New South Wales, Nick Greiner, representing the Liberal Party in coalition with the National Party, led by Wal Murray.

Buoyed by his government's strong performance in the polls, Greiner called a snap election for 25 May 1991. Despite widespread predictions by political and media commentators that Greiner would be easily re-elected to a second term, the impact of the Government's policies, particularly in terms of service cuts and increased charges, caused many voters to turn to Labor.  The 1991 state election saw the Coalition win 52 percent of the two-party vote.  However, much of the Coalition's margin was in its heartland, while Labor won many marginal seats it had lost in its severe defeat of three years prior.  The result was a hung Parliament, with the Coalition one seat short of a majority.  Greiner was forced into a minority government, relying on support from four independent politicians. Greiner's parliamentary majority was further eroded with the decision of Terry Metherell to become an Independent in late 1991, and with the loss of The Entrance in a 1992 by-election following a Court of Disputed Returns overthrowing the original result.

The ministry covers the period from 6 June 1991 when the coalition was re-elected following victory at the 1991 state election until 24 June 1992, when Greiner resigned from the ministry. Greiner decided to resign ahead of a planned no confidence motion in his actions that enticed Metherell to resign from his relatively safe Liberal seat by offering him an executive position in a government agency. An Independent Commission Against Corruption (ICAC) inquiry found that Greiner had not acted criminally and had not set out to be corrupt, he would be seen "by a notional jury as conducting himself contrary to known and recognised standards of honesty and integrity". Despite beginning proceedings before the New South Wales Court of Appeal, Greiner resigned on 24 June in the face of a warning from a group of independent politicians who told Greiner that unless he resigned, they would withdraw their support from the government and support the no-confidence motion. Greiner was successful in his appeal before the NSW Court of Appeal, which in a 2-1 decision on 21 August 1992 overturned the ICAC findings.

Greiner was succeeded by John Fahey.

Composition of ministry

 
Ministers are members of the Legislative Assembly unless otherwise noted.

See also

Members of the New South Wales Legislative Assembly, 1991–1995
Members of the New South Wales Legislative Council, 1991–1995

Notes

References

 

! colspan="3" style="border-top: 5px solid #cccccc" | New South Wales government ministries

New South Wales ministries
1991 establishments in Australia
1992 disestablishments in Australia